Arabistan or Arabestan may refer to:
Khuzestan, a province of Iran that was also known as Arabistan
Arabian Peninsula
The name of Saudi Arabia in Persian language 
 An autonomous province in the Levant (from Aleppo to the borders of Egypt) ruled by Fakhr-al-Din II, during Ottoman era.
Suudi Arabistan, a Turkish name for Saudi Arabia

See also
Arab (disambiguation)
Arabia (disambiguation)
Arabian (disambiguation)